Milesia elegans is a species of hoverfly in the family Syrphidae.

Distribution
Okinawa.

References

Insects described in 1916
Eristalinae
Diptera of Asia
Taxa named by Shōnen Matsumura